Reaching for the Moon is a 1917 American silent adventure film directed by John Emerson and written by John Emerson, Joseph Henabery, and Anita Loos. The film stars Douglas Fairbanks, Eileen Percy, Richard Henry Cummings, Millard Webb, Eugene Ormonde, and Frank Campeau. The film was released on November 17, 1917, by Paramount Pictures. It has been released on DVD.

Fairbanks later starred in a 1930 film of the same name that is unrelated to the 1917 film.

Plot
As described in a film magazine, Alexis Caesar Napoleon Brown (Fairbanks) learns that his mother was a great princess from the European province of Vulgaria but became an outcast because she did not marry royal blood. Alexis believes that if one concentrates on one thing long enough, it will come true. He is continuously concentrating on the idea some day he will be king of Vulgaria. He tells his ambitions to the girl of his dreams (Percy), who is the "patient listener." After one of his conferences with his patient sweetheart he goes home and dreams he is king of Vulgaria. On all sides his life is threatened by Black Boris (Campeau), who aspires to the throne. Arrangements are made for him to marry the Princess Valentina, but after one glance at her he is ready to run away. However, he is persuaded to remain and it becomes necessary for him to fight a duel with his rival Boris. Alexis, not knowing how to use a sword, puts up a poor fight and after a short struggle is sent flying down a steep precipice. It becomes steeper and steeper until Alexis awakens, having fallen out of bed. He is cured of his desires and is happy in his little home in New Jersey with his "patient listener" as Mrs. Alexis Caesar Napoleon Brown and a two-year-old to pass his time with.

Cast 
Douglas Fairbanks as Alexis Caesar Napoleon Brown
Eileen Percy as Elsie Merrill
Richard Henry Cummings as Old Bingham the Boss
Millard Webb as Mr. Mann
Eugene Ormonde as Sergius Badinoff the Prime
Frank Campeau as Black Boris
Joe Brooks as secondary supporting role (uncredited)
Jim Hogan as secondary supporting role (uncredited)
Bull Montana as Bus Passenger (uncredited)
Charles Stevens as Boris' Lieutenant (uncredited)
Keene Thompson as secondary supporting role (uncredited)
Erich von Stroheim as Prince Badinoff's Aide (uncredited)

References

External links 
 

 Lantern slide at silenthollywood.com

1917 films
1910s English-language films
American adventure films
1917 adventure films
Paramount Pictures films
Films directed by John Emerson
American black-and-white films
American silent feature films
1910s American films
Silent adventure films